The ALCO Century 430 is a four-axle,  diesel-electric locomotive. 16 were built between July 1966 and February 1968. Cataloged as a part of ALCO's 'Century' line of locomotives, the C430 was an upgraded version of the C425 model. Since 1992, five C430s have remained in existence.

Original Owners

Preservation 

 Green Bay & Western 315 is preserved at the National Railroad Museum in Green Bay, Wisconsin.

External links

 Sarberenyi, Robert. Alco C430 Original Owners.

B-B locomotives
Century 430
Diesel-electric locomotives of the United States
Railway locomotives introduced in 1966
Standard gauge locomotives of the United States

References